Spyroceratidae are defined as Pseudorthocerida with uniformly slender siphuncle segments, longer than wide, that contract sharply near either end, in which endosiphuncular deposits first form a compete annulus before fusing ventrally.

References

Orthoceratoidea
Prehistoric cephalopod families
Paleozoic cephalopods
Carboniferous cephalopods
Devonian cephalopods
Permian cephalopods
Silurian cephalopods
Silurian first appearances
Permian extinctions